Samp is a surname. Notable people with the surname include:

 Edward J. Samp, American football coach
 Jerzy Samp (1951–2015), Polish writer, publicist, and historian
 Wawrzyniec Samp (born 1939), Polish sculptor and graphic artist

See also